The Newcombe Medal celebrates and recognizes the performances, achievements, and contributions made by members of the Australian tennis family each year. The awards are named after Australian tennis legend John Newcombe. The awards are presented annually at an event in the latter months of the year. The inaugural year was 2010.

Athlete Awards

Newcombe Medal
The Newcombe Medal is awarded to Australia's most outstanding elite tennis player for the year. Nominees for the award are selected by a panel of Australian champions and individuals in the tennis community. The award is named in honour of the achievements of Australian tennis player John Newcombe.

Female Junior Athlete of the Year Award
Junior athlete of the year is awarded to the player 18 years and under that is ranked number 1 in their age group (ATP/WTA/ITF/AR), has demonstrated a record of playing for Australia in teams events and has displayed a positive attitude at all times.

Male Junior Athlete of the Year Award
Junior athlete of the year is awarded to the player 18 years and under that is ranked number 1 in their age group (ATP/WTA/ITF/AR), has demonstrated a record of playing for Australia in teams events and has displayed a positive attitude at all times.

Most Outstanding Athlete with a Disability
Most Outstanding Athlete with a Disability is awarded to the player ranked in the top 10, participated in at least one Grand Slam (including the Australian Tennis Championships), has demonstrated a record of playing for Australia in teams events and has displayed a positive attitude at all times.

Tournament Awards
 Most Outstanding Professional Tournament
 Most Outstanding Australian Ranking Tournament

Community Awards
 Coaching Excellence Award – High Performance
 Coaching Excellence Award – Club
 Coaching Excellence Award – Tennis Hot Shots
 Coaching Excellence Award – Talent Development
 Most Outstanding Tennis Community
 Volunteer Achievement Award
 Excellence in Officiating Award 
 Most Outstanding Club
 Most Outstanding School

References

Tennis in Australia
Awards established in 2010
2010 establishments in Australia
Australian sports trophies and awards
Tennis awards